Samuel Galloway (March 20, 1811 – April 5, 1872) was a U.S. Representative from Ohio.

Born in Gettysburg, Pennsylvania, Galloway attended local public schools. He moved to Ohio and settled in Highland County in 1830. He graduated from Miami University in Oxford, Ohio, in 1833. Galloway then attended Princeton Theological Seminary in 1835 and 1836. He taught school in Hamilton, Ohio, 1836 and 1837, at Miami University in 1837 and 1838, and Hanover College, Indiana, in 1839 and 1840.

After studying law, he was admitted to the bar in 1843 and commenced practice in Chillicothe, Ohio. He was Ohio's Secretary of State in 1844, and moved to Columbus that same year. He served as delegate to the Whig National Convention in 1848.

Galloway was elected as an Opposition Party candidate to the Thirty-fourth Congress (March 4, 1855 – March 3, 1857). He was an unsuccessful candidate for reelection in 1856 to the Thirty-fifth Congress and for election in 1858 to the Thirty-sixth Congress. He resumed the practice of law.

During the Civil War, he was appointed as the judge advocate of Camp Chase in Columbus, Ohio, by President Abraham Lincoln. Following the war, Galloway was appointed by President Andrew Johnson to investigate conditions in the South during the period of Reconstruction. He was nominated at the Republican state convention in 1867 for Lieutenant Governor of Ohio, but declined.

Presidential elector for Grant/Colfax in 1868.

He was for thirteen years a ruling elder of the Presbyterian Church.

Galloway died in Columbus, Ohio, April 5, 1872, and was interred in Green Lawn Cemetery, Columbus, Ohio.

Notes

Sources

External links

1811 births
1872 deaths
People from Gettysburg, Pennsylvania
American Presbyterians
Ohio Whigs
Opposition Party members of the United States House of Representatives from Ohio
Ohio Republicans
1868 United States presidential electors
Secretaries of State of Ohio
Politicians from Chillicothe, Ohio
People from Highland County, Ohio
People of Ohio in the American Civil War
Miami University alumni
Miami University faculty
Burials at Green Lawn Cemetery (Columbus, Ohio)
19th-century American politicians